Phassus guianensis is a moth of the family Hepialidae. It is known from Guyana.

References

Moths described in 1940
Hepialidae